Linda Hathorn ( Consolante, born May 23, 1982) is a Canadian retired professional soccer defender, who won the silver medal with the Canadian national team at the 2003 Pan American Games and finished fourth at the 2003 FIFA Women’s World Cup in the United States.

On July 20, 2003, 21-year-old Hathorn made her first international appearance with the Canada national team in a 2–1 win over Brazil in Ottawa.

She is married to Donnie Hathorn.

References

External links
 Linda Consolante at the University of Maine Sports Hall of Fame
 
 Linda Hathorn at Valparaiso Crusaders
 Linda Hathorn at Maine Black Bears
 Linda Hathorn at Iona Gaels
 

1982 births
Women's association football defenders
Canada women's international soccer players
Canadian women's soccer players
2003 FIFA Women's World Cup players
Living people
Soccer players from Montreal
Pan American Games silver medalists for Canada
Pan American Games medalists in football
Maine Black Bears women's soccer players
Footballers at the 2003 Pan American Games
Medalists at the 2003 Pan American Games
Canadian expatriate soccer coaches
Canadian expatriate women's soccer players
Canadian expatriate sportspeople in the United States
Expatriate women's soccer players in the United States
Expatriate soccer managers in the United States
USL W-League (1995–2015) players
Northern Arizona Lumberjacks coaches
Valparaiso Beacons women's soccer coaches
Regis Rangers soccer
Maine Black Bears women's soccer
Maine Black Bears coaches
Iona Gaels women's soccer
Iona Gaels coaches
Ottawa Fury (women) players